Jorge Sarmiento Koochoi  (2 November 1900 - 20 February 1957) was a Peruvian football forward who played for Peru in the 1930 FIFA World Cup. He also played for Alianza Lima.

References

External links
FIFA profile

1900 births
1957 deaths
Footballers from Lima
Peruvian footballers
Peruvian people of Chinese descent
Peru international footballers
Association football forwards
José Gálvez FBC footballers
Club Alianza Lima footballers
Peruvian Primera División players
1930 FIFA World Cup players